Jutiapa is a municipality in Jutiapa Department, Guatemala.

Jutiapa may also refer to:

 Jutiapa Department, a department in Guatemala
 Jutiapa, Cabañas, a municipality in Cabañas Department, El Salvador
 Jutiapa, Atlántida, a municipality in Atlántida Department, Honduras